Sir James Craig  (16 October 1861 – 12 July 1933) was an Irish professor of medicine and an independent politician.

Craig was born at Castlecatt, Bushmills, County Antrim. He was educated at the Coleraine Academical Institution and Trinity College Dublin, where he obtained the B.A. and M.B., B.Ch. degrees of the University in 1885. He proceeded M.D. in 1891, and was elected a Fellow of the Royal College of Physicians of Ireland in the same year. He was physician to Sir Patrick Dun's Hospital and consultant physician to Dr Steevens' Hospital, among others. He was King's Professor of Medicine at Trinity College.

He was elected to the House of Commons of Southern Ireland at the 1921 general election, representing the Dublin University constituency as an independent Unionist. He did not participate in the Second Dáil. He was re-elected as a Teachta Dála for the same constituency at the 1922 general election and became a member of the Third Dáil. He was re-elected at the next five general elections, but died four months after the 1933 general election, in which he had been returned to the 8th Dáil. The by-election for his seat was won by another independent candidate Robert Rowlette.

He died in Dublin, aged 71. The Sir James Craig Memorial Prize has been awarded annually in Trinity College since 1952 to the student gaining first place at the final examination in medicine.

References

External links
 

1861 births
1933 deaths
Irish knights
Independent TDs
Members of the 2nd Dáil
Members of the 3rd Dáil
Members of the 4th Dáil
Members of the 5th Dáil
Members of the 6th Dáil
Members of the 7th Dáil
Members of the 8th Dáil
People of the Irish Civil War (Pro-Treaty side)
Academics of Trinity College Dublin
Alumni of Trinity College Dublin
Teachtaí Dála for Dublin University
People from County Antrim
Knights Bachelor
19th-century Irish medical doctors
20th-century Irish medical doctors
Fellows of the Royal College of Physicians of Ireland
Presidents of the Royal College of Physicians of Ireland